is a Japanese light novel series written by Nozomu Mochitsuki. The series began publication on the novel posting website Shōsetsuka ni Narō in August 2018; it was later acquired by TO Books, who are publishing the series in print with illustrations by Gilse. A manga adaptation, illustrated by Mizu Morino, began serialization on the Comic Corona manga website in August 2019. An anime television series adaptation by Silver Link is set to premiere in 2023.

Plot 
At the collapsed Tearmoon Empire, 20 years old Princess Mia, who was scorned as the selfish princess, was executed through guillotine. Instead of dying, she awakens to find herself back in her 12 year old body. Pleading to avoid the execution at all cost, she decides to rebuild the empire. As such, she would "put her own safety first." Her supposedly selfish action, mixed with her knowledge from her first life, somehow charms the people around her instead as she works hard to turn her enemies in her first life to be her allies.

Characters

The protagonist of the series and the sole princess of Tearmoon Empire. At 20 years old, a revolution leads to her execution, but she somehow leaps back through time and wakes up a twelve-year-old. Thus, she begins to right what once went wrong and starts to fix the empire's problems while armed with a diary from the future. When it comes to saving her own skin, Mia spares no effort. Thanks to the strings of misunderstandings encircling her and her knowledge of the future, the princess who was once known as "Selfish Princess who ruined Tearmoon" eventually becomes known as "The Great Sage of the Empire". On the surface, they couldn't be more different. At their core, they were one and the same. Beneath the delusions surrounding her lay an arrogant, coward and slightly-selfish persona that hid a lovable idiot even further below. Because by God, she was trying despite her flaws.

One of the most loyal subjects of Mia and her right hand. She is Mia's personal maid-in-waiting. In the previous timeline, she and Ludwig were the only ones who stood alongside Mia until the end.

One of the most loyal subjects of Mia and her left hand (Right hand regarding political matters). He works at Golden Moon Ministry. In the previous timeline, he and Anne were the only ones who stood alongside Mia until the end.

Media

Light novels
Written by Nozomu Mochitsuki, the series began publication on the Shōsetsuka ni Narō novel posting website on August 13, 2018. In June 2019, the series was acquired by TO Books, who published the series in print with illustrations by Gilse. As of January 2023, twelve volumes have been released.

In November 2019, J-Novel Club announced that they licensed the novels for English publication under their J-Novel Heart imprint.

Volume list

Manga
A manga adaptation, illustrated by Mizu Morino, began serialization on the Comic Corona manga website on August 12, 2019. As of September 2022, its individual chapters have been collected into five tankōbon volumes.

In May 2022, J-Novel Club announced that they also licensed the manga.

Volume list

Theatrical
A theatrical adaptation of the novel series ran in Tokyo from September 9 to 13, 2020. It was directed by Yuki Shinome and written by Suika Suika. Kanako Hiramatsu, Reo Hotta, and Miyuki Torii performed the lead roles. A second theatrical performance with the same staff and cast as the first was shown in Tokyo from July 14 to July 19, 2021.

Anime
An anime television series adaptation was announced on September 6, 2022. It is produced by Silver Link and directed by Yūshi Ibe, with scripts written by Deko Akao, character designs handled by Mai Otsuka, and music composed by Kōji Fujimoto. The series is set to premiere in 2023.

Reception
Rebecca Silverman from Anime News Network praised the series for its illustrations and tone, while criticizing the authorial interjections.

The manga was nominated for the 2021 Next Manga Award in the web manga category.

As of September 2022, the series has sold over 850,000 copies between its digital and print releases.

Notes

References

External links
  
  
  
  
 

2019 Japanese novels
2023 anime television series debuts
Anime and manga about time travel
Anime and manga based on light novels
Fantasy anime and manga
J-Novel Club books
Japanese fantasy novels
Japanese webcomics
Light novels
Light novels first published online
Shōjo manga
Shōsetsuka ni Narō
Silver Link
Upcoming anime television series
Webcomics in print